Dennis Joseph Hoggart (born 2 January 1939 in Glasgow, Scotland) is a Scottish former professional footballer.

After spending three years with Leeds United, Hoggart played for York City and Stockport County in the Football League Fourth Division. He later played for Australian team Sydney Prague.

Personal life
Hoggart and his wife, Sonjie, currently live in Sydney, as their youngest daughter, Kellie (born 1 May 1974), currently lives in Melbourne. She was formerly a member of the Teen Queens, an Australian pop group from 1992 to 1993 and an original member of Hi-5, an Australian children's music group aligned with a TV series of the same name from 1998 to 2008. His oldest daughter, Kyllé (born 22 May) currently resides in Los Angeles. Kyllé played the role of Roberta 'Robbie' Henderson in The Ferals, an Australian children's television series from 1994 to 1995.

References

1939 births
Leeds United F.C. players
York City F.C. players
Stockport County F.C. players
Scottish footballers
Living people
Footballers from Glasgow
Scottish expatriate footballers
Expatriate soccer players in Australia
Association football forwards
Ferndale Athletic F.C. players